Joshua Jones (born 12 May 1993) is an English professional rugby league footballer who plays as a  forward for the Huddersfield Giants in the Betfred Super League and Great Britain at international level.

He spent time on loan from Saints at the Rochdale Hornets in the Kingstone Press Championship and the York City Knights in Championship 1. Jones played for the Salford Red Devils, featuring for the club in the 2019 Super League Grand Final, and has also played for Hull FC in the Super League.

Jones was contracted to play rugby union for the Exeter Chiefs in the English Rugby Premiership, and spent time on loan from Exeter playing for Taunton in 2015.

Background
Jones was born in Leyland, Lancashire, England.

Early career
Jones signed for St Helens as a 16-year-old in 2009 from Blackbrook Royals, after previously playing for Chorley Panthers and Leyland Warriors. He has international honours from his youth rugby days; playing for England under 16s against France Schoolboys in 2009.

Playing career

St Helens
In June 2012, Joshua signed a 3-year contract with St Helens.

St Helens reached the 2014 Super League Grand Final, and Jones was selected to play at centre in their 14-6 victory over the Wigan Warriors at Old Trafford.

Exeter Chiefs
On 17 June 2015 it was announced that Jones would be switching to rugby union to play for Aviva Premiership club Exeter Chiefs for the 2015-16 season.

Salford Red Devils
However Jones' spell in rugby union did not last long, citing personal reasons, where he switched back to rugby league for the start of the 2016 Super League season, signing for Salford Red Devils.

He played in the 2019 Super League Grand Final defeat by St. Helens at Old Trafford.

Hull FC
Jones played for Hull F.C. in the 2020 season.

Huddersfield Giants
On 24 December 2020 it was announced that Jones would join the Huddersfield Giants for the 2021 season.
In round 15 of the 2021 Super League season, he was sent off after the full-time siren for fighting in Huddersfield's 40-26 victory over Hull F.C.
On 28 May 2022, he played for Huddersfield in their 2022 Challenge Cup Final loss to Wigan.

International
He was selected in squad for the 2019 Great Britain Lions tour of the Southern Hemisphere. He made his Great Britain test debut in the defeat by Tonga.

References

External links

Salford Red Devils profile
SL profile
Saints Heritage Society profile

1993 births
Living people
English rugby league players
English rugby union players
Exeter Chiefs players
Great Britain national rugby league team players
Huddersfield Giants players
Hull F.C. players
People from Leyland, Lancashire
Rochdale Hornets players
Rugby league centres
Rugby league players from Lancashire
Rugby league second-rows
Rugby league locks
Rugby union centres
Rugby union players from Lancashire
Salford Red Devils players
St Helens R.F.C. players
York City Knights players